Abdelhak Mrini (also known as Abdelhak El Merini, also spelled as Lamrini or Lemrini; Arabic: عبد الحق المريني; born 31 May 1934, Rabat), is a Moroccan historian, civil servant and writer.

Biography

Born in Rabat, Mrini Is the author of several books and was awarded the Moroccan Book Prize for Al-Jaysh al-maghribi abra at-tarikh (The Moroccan Army Through History).

Since December 2010, he has been the Moroccan governments chief historian, replacing Hassan Aourid, and since October 2012, the spokesman of the Royal Palace of Mohammed VI. As spokesman for the palace, after having kept to press releases, he spoke for the first time in an article - via the London-based, Arabic-language daily Acharq Al-Awsat in July 2013.

Notes and references

External links
 (in Arabic and French)

1934 births
Living people
People from Rabat
20th-century Moroccan historians
Advisors of Mohammed VI of Morocco